Compson is a surname. Notable people with the name include:
Betty Compson (1897–1974), American actress
Hartwell B. Compson (1842–1905), American military officer 
Fictional characters
Compson family, including Caddy Compson and Quentin Compson, in the works of William Faulkner
Ladonna Compson in the television show Arthur.